Cozzo Spadaro Lighthouse is an active lighthouse located at the top of a hill in the Quartiere named Cozzo Spadaro in the municipality of Portopalo di Capo Passero, the southernmost comune of Sicily, on the Ionian Sea.

Description
The tower and the base are 
of unpainted white stone, the lantern is white and the dome is grey metallic. The lighthouse is completely automated and managed by the Marina Militare with the identification code number 2918 E.F.

See also
 List of lighthouses in Italy

References

External links

 Servizio Fari Marina Militare

Lighthouses in Italy
Buildings and structures in Sicily